In enzymology, a chloromuconate cycloisomerase is an enzyme that catalyzes the chemical reaction

2-chloro-2,5-dihydro-5-oxofuran-2-acetate  3-chloro-cis,cis-muconate

Hence, this enzyme has one substrate, 2-chloro-2,5-dihydro-5-oxofuran-2-acetate, and one product, 3-chloro-cis,cis-muconate.

This enzyme belongs to the family of isomerases, specifically the class of intramolecular lyases.  The systematic name of this enzyme class is 2-chloro-2,5-dihydro-5-oxofuran-2-acetate lyase (decyclizing). This enzyme is also called muconate cycloisomerase II.  This enzyme participates in gamma-hexachlorocyclohexane degradation and 1,4-dichlorobenzene degradation.  It employs one cofactor, manganese.

Structural studies

References

 

EC 5.5.1
Manganese enzymes
Enzymes of known structure